1979 Lunar New Year Cup was a Hong Kong football tournament, played on the first few days of Chinese New Year.

Participating teams
  Hong Kong League XI
  Guangdong
  Öster

Match results

References
 Takungpao, 1979-01-27, page 12
 Wah Kiu Yat Po, 1979-01-30, section 3 page 4 (total page 12)
 Takungpao, 1979-01-31, page 12
 Takungpao, 1979-02-02, page 12
 Takungpao, 1979-02-03, page 12

See also
 1979 Guangdong–Hong Kong Cup

1979
1978–79 in Hong Kong football
1979 in Chinese football
1979 in Swedish football